Homeier is a surname. Notable people with the surname include:

 Bill Homeier (1918–2001), American racing driver
 Merle Homeier (born 1999), German long jumper
 Skip Homeier (1930–2017), American actor

See also
 Homeyer